Aerochute International Pty. Ltd is an Australian aircraft manufacturer founded in 1989 by Stephen Conte and based in Coburg North, Victoria. The company specializes in the design and manufacture of powered parachutes in the form of kits for amateur construction for the European Fédération Aéronautique Internationale microlight category. The aircraft are also approved by the  Australian Civil Aviation Safety Authority.

The company introduced its single seat model, the Aerochute International Hummerchute in 1989 and the two-seat Aerochute International Dual in 1992.

Aerochute is also an approved powered parachute flight training school, with locations in Melbourne and Perth.

Aircraft

References

External links

Aircraft manufacturers of Australia
Ultralight aircraft
Homebuilt aircraft
Powered parachutes
Australian companies established in 1989
Manufacturing companies based in Melbourne